Clarens is the name of several places:

 Clarens, Free State, a town in Free State Province, South Africa
 Clarens, Hautes-Pyrénées, a commune in the Hautes-Pyrénées department of southwestern France
 Clarens, Switzerland, a small village in the canton of Vaud
 Clarens (Alexandria, Virginia), U.S., a historic mansion

See also
 Clarence (disambiguation)